Shamita Shetty (born 2 February 1979) is an Indian Bollywood actress, model and interior designer. She made her Hindi film debut in the musical romance film Mohabbatein (2000), which earned her the IIFA Award for Star Debut of the Year – Female.

She went on to do films including Bewafaa (2005) and Cash (2007). Following this, she participated in several reality television shows like Bigg Boss 3 (2009) and Jhalak Dikhhla Jaa (2015). Later, she was a finalist on the stunt-based show Khatron Ke Khiladi 9 (2019) and the game reality series Bigg Boss OTT (2021) and Bigg Boss 15 (2021–2022).

Early life
Shetty was born on 2 February 1979 in a Tulu-speaking Bunt family, in Mumbai. Her late father Surendra and her mother Sunanda were manufacturers of tamper-proof water caps in the pharmaceutical industry. Shilpa Shetty is her elder sister.

She did her schooling from St. Anthony's Girls' High School, Mumbai. After completing her degree in commerce from Sydenham College, Shetty did a fashion designing diploma from SNDT College, Mumbai. After this, she started her internship with fashion designer Manish Malhotra, but Manish saw a spark in her and suggested to prep her for her acting career. In 2011, Shetty decided to follow her passion in interior design. Her first solo project was Royalty, a club in Mumbai. Later, her love for interior design pushed her to do a diploma from Central Saint Martins and Inchbald School of Design in London.

Personal life
Shetty is a fitness and wellness enthusiast. She actively promotes workout, meditation and yoga. Apart from being a professional interior designer, she also enjoys painting.

Career

Mohabbatein and early success (2000–2013)
Shetty made her film debut in 2000 with the Yash Raj Films movie Mohabbatein, directed by Aditya Chopra. Her portrayal of Ishika earned her the 2001 IIFA Award for Star Debut of the Year – Female. Soon after, she gave hit dance numbers to Bollywood, including Sharara Sharara in Mere Yaar Ki Shaadi Hai (2002), Chori Pe Chori in Saathiya (2002) and Mind Blowing Mahiya in Cash (2007). She was appreciated for her acting in the film Zeher (2005), for which she was nominated for the Stardust Award as Star of the Year Female (2006). Sify said, "Shamita Shetty is a surprise, a revelation. The actress proves that she can deliver if given an opportunity. She looks gorgeous all through, but more than anything else, it's her talent that you notice at the end of the show." She worked with her sister Shilpa Shetty in the film Fareb. She also starred in multi-star projects like Bewafaa (2005) and Cash (2007). In 2009, she participated in the reality television series Bigg Boss 3. After 42 days, she left the show to attend her sister Shilpa Shetty's wedding. She was the only contestant who wasn't nominated even once during her stay in the Bigg Boss house.

Focus on interior design and entrepreneurship (2013–2017)
Alongside her acting career, Shetty decided to focus on her passion for interior designing. After completing an interior designing course in London and finishing an internship with an architect's firm, she launched her own interior designing company Golden Leaf Interiors. Her first interior designing project was Royalty, a club in Mumbai. She designed her sister, Shilpa Shetty's son Viaan's room. She won the Best Interior Design Award at the Asia Spa Awards for designing Chandigarh Iosis Spa.

Further work, Bigg Boss and recognition (2017–present)
In 2017, Shetty appeared on the dancing reality show Jhalak Dikhhla Jaa. She then starred in Voot's comedy web series Yo Ke Hua Bro, also co-starring Aparshakti Khurana, Gaurav Pandey and Ridhima Pandit. In 2019, she participated in Colors TV's stunt reality show Fear Factor: Khatron Ke Khiladi, ending up as the third runner up. Shetty then starred in T-Series' music video titled Teri Maa.

In 2020, she starred in the film The Tenant as Meera. She then portrayed Kavita Tharoor in ZEE5's thriller film Black Widows. The Indian Express said that “Shamita Shetty brings a vivaciousness to her role.” In 2021, The Tenant was screened at the Indian Film Festival of Los Angeles. It won the Best Film Award at the Indian Film Festival Stuttgart 2021.

In September 2021, she participated in Voot's Bigg Boss OTT, finishing as the second runner up. In October, she participated in Colors TV's Bigg Boss 15. She became the first and the last captain of the season, and the only contestant to become the captain twice. Shetty also won the Style Icon Award. She finished her journey as the third runner up.

In 2022, she starred in T-Series' music video titled Tere Vich Rab Disda. The Tenant is released in theatres in 2023. About her role, Shetty said, "The Tenant is a reflection of society from a modern, independent, single woman's perspective, with experiences and learnings every woman in India has been subjected to at some point of her life. The compelling backdrop and sensitive as well as realistic narrative of the film connected with me, prompting me to instantly agree to do the film. I truly believe, every woman and the people around her, would deeply resonate with the story, offering a deeper insight into the disturbing, prevailing realities of the society we live in today."

Other work

Philanthropy
In 2012, Shetty walked the ramp for charity fashion show Caring With Style to raise money for children suffering from cancer. In 2013, she starred in Betiyaan, a government initiated social cause music video for the Save the girl child campaign.

In 2017, Shetty collaborated with an NGO that is dedicated to the cause of providing care for stray and abandoned cats. She also walked the ramp for Roopa Vohra at the fashion show for a social cause She Matters. In 2018, she joined hands with Help Age India, an NGO that works for the welfare of the elderly. Shetty took part in a digital literacy initiative and said that familiarising the elderly with latest technology is crucial in keeping them connected.

In 2019, Shetty flagged off a walkathon on the International Day for Older Persons, vouching for the government to increase pension for the elderly. Shetty visits an orphanage on her birthday every year and spends time with the elderly, bringing them packed surprises.

Brands and associations
Shetty has endorsed Pantene with sister Shilpa Shetty for a year. She has been associated with brands and companies like Aldo, Audi and the IIFJAS Jewellery exhibition.

Media image
In 2016, Shetty walked the ramp during Lakme Fashion Week for Divya Reddy. In 2017, she walked the India International Jewellery Week ramp for Surya Golds. She also walked the ramp for  Swarovski Gemstones at GJC NITE 2019. In 2020, she was the showstopper for designer Priya Machineni's spring collection at Lotus India Fashion Week.

Shetty has featured on covers of magazines like The Lifestyle Journalist, G Magazine, Stuff Magazine, iCraze, Women Fitness Magazine, Femina India and Fitlook Magazine.

Filmography

Films

Web series

Television

Music videos

Awards and nominations

See also 
 List of Indian film actresses
 List of Hindi film actresses

References

External links 

 
 
 

Living people
1979 births
Actresses from Mumbai
Indian film actresses
Indian web series actresses
Actresses in Hindi cinema
Actresses in Tamil cinema
Actresses in Telugu cinema
Bigg Boss (Hindi TV series) contestants
Fear Factor: Khatron Ke Khiladi participants
Female models from Mumbai
Mangaloreans
Tulu people
Indian interior designers
Indian women designers
International Indian Film Academy Awards winners
SNDT Women's University alumni
21st-century Indian designers
21st-century Indian actresses